Christine Beveridge  is an Australian scientist and plant physiologist whose research focuses on the shoot architecture of plants, shrubs and trees. She is an Australian Research Council Laureate Fellow in the School of Biological Sciences at the University of Queensland, Director of the Australian Research Council Centre of Excellence for Plant Success in Nature and Agriculture, and affiliated professor at the Centre for Crop Science at the Queensland Alliance for Agriculture and Food Innovation.

Beveridge has a BSc and PhD from the University of Tasmania. She was elected Fellow of the Australian Academy of Science in 2015.

In 2018 Beveridge was awarded the ARC Georgina Sweet Laureate Fellowship to research  "the genetic mechanisms of shoot branching in agricultural and horticultural plants". In the same year she was elected president of the International Plant Growth Substances Association.

Selected publications

References

External links 

 University of Queensland profile
 Australian Academy of Science profile
 Women in Research podcast

Living people
Year of birth missing (living people)
University of Tasmania alumni
Academic staff of the University of Queensland
Fellows of the Australian Academy of Science
Plant physiologists
Australian women scientists